Chander Prakash Gurnani or C. P. Gurnani (born December 19, 1958) is the CEO & Managing Director of Tech Mahindra.

Early life and education
Gurnani was born in Neemuch, a small town in Madhya Pradesh and spent his early life in Chittorgarh, Kota, and Jaipur in Rajasthan. He has a degree in Chemical Engineering from the National Institute of Technology, Rourkela.

Career
Gurnani has been appointed as Nasscom's chairman in April 2016 for a one-year term.

In a career spanning 32 years, he has held several leading positions with HCL, Hewlett Packard Limited, Perot Systems (India) Limited and HCL Corporation Ltd.

Awards and honours
Gurnani has been chosen as the Ernst and Young ‘Entrepreneur of the Year [Manager]’, CNBC Asia's ‘India Business Leader of the Year’ and Dataquest ‘IT person of the Year’ - for the year 2013.
Gurnani has also won the 'CEO of the Year' Award for year 2014 declared by Business Standard
He was awarded with Dataquest IT Person of the Year in 2014.
Veer Surendra Sai University of Technology awarded the degree of Doctor of Science (Honoris Causa) to Shri C. P. Gurnani for his outstanding contribution to the field of Technology and Management in 2016.
In 2018, Gurnani was ranked 488 of the "Best CEOs In The World" by the CEOWORLD magazine.

References

External links
Tech Mahindra Board Members
CP Gurnani

Indian chief executives
Living people
1958 births
People from Neemuch